The Visakhapatnam–Secunderabad Garib Rath Express is a daily running superfast garib rath train of the Indian Railways connecting Secunderabad Railway Station to Visakhapatnam. This is the first and only Garib Rath to run daily. The train numbers are 12739 and 12740. It belongs to the South Central Railways. Train number 12740 runs from Secunderabad to Visakhapatnam and train number 12739 runs from Visakhapatnam to Secunderabad.

Train Details

Route
The train stops at  Warangal, Khammam, Vijayawada, Eluru, Rajahmundry, Samalkot, Tuni, Anakapalle  and Duvvada.

Coaches
The rake initially had 3AC and AC Chair Car coaches; due to inconvenience in the AC Chair Car, it has been removed. Now the train runs with all 3AC coaches. When it was a non daily train, the rake was shared by Secunderabad Yesvantpur Garib Rath Express. But now it has a dedicated rake. 
This train holds record for being the lengthiest Garib Rath Train in India. It has 18 AC Three Tier Coaches and 2 EOG Power Cars making a total of 20 coaches.

Loco
It is regularly hauled by a single Lallaguda based Indian locomotive class WAP4/WAP7 locomotive with a reversal at Vijayawada.

See also
List of trains run by Indian Railways
 Godavari Express - A daily ICF train connecting Hyderabad Deccan to Visakhapatnam.
 Duronto Express - A series of point-to-point, non-stop AC/Non-AC trains run in India.
 Secunderabad – Visakhapatnam AC Express - Weekly AC train
 Visakha Express - A daily ICF train connecting Secunderabad to Bhubaneshwar.

References

External links
Indiarailinfo

Rail transport in Andhra Pradesh
Rail transport in Telangana
Garib Rath Express trains
Transport in Visakhapatnam